John de Britto, SJ (also spelled Brito), also known as Arul Anandar, (born in Lisbon, Portugal on 1 March 1647 – died at Orur, Tamil Nadu, India on 4 February 1693) was a Portuguese Jesuit missionary and martyr, often called "the Portuguese St Francis Xavier" by Indian Catholics. He is also called the John the Baptist of India.

Early life and missionary work
John de Britto was the scion of a powerful aristocratic Portuguese family; his father, Salvador de Britto Pereira, died while serving as Viceroy of the Portuguese colony of Brazil.  He joined the Jesuits in 1662, studying at the famous University of Coimbra. He travelled to the missions of Madurai, in Southern India, present-day Tamil Nadu, in 1673 and preached the Christian religion in the region of the Maravar country. He renamed himself Arul Anandar (அருளானந்தர்) in Tamil. The ruler of the Maravar country imprisoned him in 1684. Having been expelled, he returned to Lisbon in 1687 and worked as a missions procurator. King Pedro II wanted him to stay, but in 1690 he returned to the Maravar country with 24 new missionaries.

The Madurai Mission was a bold attempt to establish an Indian Catholic Church that was relatively free of European cultural domination.  As such, Britto learned the native languages, went about dressed in yellow cotton, and lived like a Tamil Thuravi/Sannyasi, abstaining from every kind of animal food and from wine.Britto tried to teach the Catholic faith in categories and concepts that would make sense to the people he taught. This method, proposed and practised by Roberto de Nobili, met with remarkable success. Britto remained a strict vegan until the end of his life, rejecting meat, fish, eggs and alcohol, and living only on legumes, fruits and herbs.

Martyrdom

John de Britto's preaching led to the conversion of Thadiyathevan (தடியத் தேவன்), a Maravar prince who had several wives. When Thadiyathevan was required to dismiss all his wives but one, a serious problem arose. One of the wives was a niece of the neighbouring king, the Raghunatha Kilavan Sethupathi (சேதுபதி), the King of Ramnad (Ramanathapuram), who took up her quarrel and began a general persecution of Christians. Britto and the catechists were taken and carried to the capital, Ramnad. Thence he was led to Orur (ஓரியூர்), some 30 miles northward along the coast, where he was executed on 4 February 1693.

Britto was beatified by Pope Pius IX on 21 August 1853. He was canonised by Pope Pius XII on 22 June 1947. Saint John de Britto's feast day is 4 February.

Red Sand 
This seashore sightseeing location is one of the most venerable pilgrim centres of Christians in the world over, as it is said to be the site of Britto's martyrdom. It was at this place where Britto is said to have been beheaded in 1693. The sand dune here is believed to have been stained by his blood. There is a shrine constructed in Portuguese style containing a statue of Britto, known locally as 'Arul Anandar' who had modestly offered his neck to the executioner.

The red sand dune here in this shrine where the blood of Britto was spilled has great significance. Numerous incurable diseases are said to have cured by the application of the red sand on the respective body parts. Couples are believed to have blessed with children on visiting the shrine and praying to the departed soul. During festivities, pilgrims mainly from Tamil Nadu and Kerala participate irrespective of their caste, creed and religion. Thus, together with Christians, Hindus and Muslims also come to worship at the shrine in thousands, to mark respect to a unique holy man who shed his life and blood at that spot. The occasion appears to be more as a social gathering rather than a religious festival. The auspicious ceremony is a rare opportunity for these simple people to bring gaiety and enthusiasm in their life. The strong faith and enviable ability to combine pleasure and righteousness on a pilgrimage gives a divine atmosphere to the Orur festival.

Devotees from other dioceses and districts visit the shrine on specific dates. In February, believers from Dindigul arrive while in June, they are from Karunguli and Nagapattinam. During September more than 25,000 pilgrims used to visit the shrine for dedicating prayers and offerings. In October, nearly 25,000 pilgrims arrive from the neighbouring Sivagangai district and in December, visitors are from Madurai and Melur. Throughout the year, thousands of pilgrims from Sakthikulangara, a Catholic parish in Kerala, visit the shrine.

In Portugal
His name was given to the Jesuit-run Colégio de São João de Brito (Saint John de Britto College), located in Lisbon, Portugal.

In India 
There is a shrine to Britto in the village of Orur (also spelled Oreiour), where he is a significant figure revered by the Kallar, Maravar and Agamudayar.

There is only one church in Coimbatore dedicated to John de Britto and located at R S Puram, and it is one of the largest parishes in the diocese of Coimbatore. There is also a church in Subramaniapuram in Tiruchirapalli district of Tamil Nadu dedicated to him. In 2016, a Church was built in honour of St. John de Britto at Laggere, Bangalore (Karnataka). 

One of the four houses in the Jesuit school, St Xavier's, Durgapur, is named after John de Britto. In the Campion School of Mumbai and St Xavier's Hazaribag  there is a house named after Britto (Britto House). The other two houses are named for Francis Xavier (Xavier House) and Ignatius of Loyola (Loyola House). One of four houses in the Jesuit school, St Stanislaus High School. The other three houses named after Francis Xavier (Xavier House), Ignatius of Loyola (Loyola House) and Stanislaus Kostka (Kostka House). Also one of the four houses in St. Xavier's School, Kolkata, is named after Britto. 

One of the three houses in the Infant Jesus Anglo-Indian Higher Secondary School Tangasseri, Kollam is named after John de Britto (Brittos). The other two houses are named for John Bosco (Boscos) and John Berchmans (Berchmans). Campion Anglo Indian Higher Seconday school Tiruchirapalli which is one of the prestigious schools in Tiruchirapalli district of Tamil Nadu also has a house named after him.

St Britto High School in Goa is named after Britto as he lived there for seven months to complete his theological studies at St Paul's College in Old Goa. The school is administered by the Jesuits. There is an Anglo-Indian Boys High School in the Kochi Diocese, in the old Portuguese city of Fort Cochin, named after John de Britto, nearby the Bishop's House, in Kochi. There is a St. John De Britto College of Education at Thanjavur, Tamil Nadu (B.Ed. and M.Ed. college) since Britto worked in the Diocese of Thanjavur as well.

Britto is the patron saint (referred as Pathukavul) of Sakthikulangara Parish in Kollam Diocese, Kerala. Every year, Britto's feast day is celebrated in Sakthikulangara with a big procession (prathikshanam). The St John De Britto Anglo-Indian High School is named after him.
One of the Jesuit colleges established in Tamil Nadu is named after Britto as Arul Anandar College (Arts & Science) which is in Karumathur, Madurai, as well as St. Arul Anandar School, Orur, in the town where Britto died. These last two schools were established by the Jesuits to promote education in the rural parts of Tamil Nadu.

Other countries
In the Philippines, Britto is honoured with several class sections named after him in the Jesuit-run schools:
Section 11-De Brito in Ateneo de Manila Senior High School
Four high school class sections in Ateneo de Davao University (1-De Brito; 2-De Brito; 3-De Brito; 4-De Brito)
A Grade 8 level (formerly Grade 9 but changed into a Grade 8 section) class section in Xavier University – Ateneo de Cagayan

In Yogyakarta, Indonesia, a Jesuit school for boys is named after him, SMA Kolese De Britto (De Britto College Senior High School).

In Penang, Malaysia, there is a church called Church of St John Britto. The church is part of City Parish in the city of Georgetown, Penang. It was built in 1969. On 3 February 2019, the city parish held a Golden Jubilee celebration.

In Mauritius there is a chapel named St Jean de Britto dedicated to Tamil Catholics living in the area.

In Brazil there is a São João de Brito Parish in the Roman Catholic Diocese of Santo Amaro, one of the dioceses in the city of São Paulo. The parish was founded on 30 December 1952 and remains as one of the churches among the Pastoral Sector of Saint Amaro in the diocese.

See also
List of Christian martyrs
List of saints of the Society of Jesus
List of vegans
Madurai Nayak Dynasty

Notes

References

Bibliography

External links

Saint of the Day, February 4: John de Britto at SaintPatrickDC.org

1647 births
1693 deaths
17th-century Christian saints
17th-century Roman Catholic martyrs
17th-century Portuguese Jesuits
Portuguese people executed abroad
Portuguese Roman Catholic saints
Portuguese Roman Catholic missionaries
Clergy from Lisbon
Jesuit martyrs
Jesuit saints
University of Coimbra alumni
People executed by India by decapitation
Jesuit missionaries in India
Christian martyrs
Canonizations by Pope Pius XII